The 2017 Ball State Cardinals football team represented Ball State University in the 2017 NCAA Division I FBS football season. They were led by second-year head coach Mike Neu and played their home games at Scheumann Stadium in Muncie, Indiana as members of the West Division of the Mid-American Conference. They finished the season 2–10, 0–8 in MAC play to finish in last place in the West Division.

Previous season 
The Cardinals finished the 2016 season 4–8, 1–7 in MAC play to finish in last place in the West Division.

Coaching staff

Source:

Schedule

Source:

Game summaries

at Illinois

UAB

Tennessee Tech

at WKU

at Western Michigan

at Akron

Central Michigan

Toledo

at Eastern Michigan

at Northern Illinois

Buffalo

Miami (OH)

References

Ball State
Ball State Cardinals football seasons
Ball State Cardinals football